Wesson may refer to
Wesson, Mississippi, a town in Copiah County
Wesson, Texas, a ghost town in Cormal County
Wesson, Arkansas, a township in Union County, Arkansas
Wesson cooking oil, a brand now owned by Richardson International, Limited
USS Wesson (DE-184), a United States Navy destroyer escort
Wesson (surname)